Charles Edward "Ned" Bromley (1869–1 April 1942) was an English footballer. Originally from Southampton, he played as a forward for local side St. Mary's between their formation in 1885 and 1889.

Life and career
Born between April and June 1869, Bromley joined the football team of the St. Mary's Young Men's Association upon its formation in November 1885. He played in the team's first game, a friendly match against Freemantle, By 1887, Bromley had become the captain of St. Mary's, leading the side to the final of the 1887–88 Hampshire Junior Cup, where the Saints beat the Southampton Harriers 2–1 in a replay after a 2–2 draw; the forward scored seven goals throughout the course of the tournament, including four in the second round 10–0 win over Petersfield.

Following the club's Hampshire Junior Cup victory, Bromley relinquished his captaincy and moved to London to study dentistry, although he continued to play for St. Mary's. In the following season, Bromley continued to be "almost ever-present" in the team's lineup as they retained the Hampshire Junior Cup, scoring three goals in six appearances in the tournament, including one in the 3–0 final win over Christchurch. Shortly after the cup final, Bromley suffered a "serious leg injury" during a six-a-side tournament, bringing his playing career to an end.

After his injury, Bromley focused on his dental career, later moving to Chester and Gibraltar; he died in Darlington in 1942.

Career statistics

References

Bibliography

 
  

1869 births
1942 deaths
English footballers
Southampton F.C. players
Footballers from Southampton
Association football forwards